Carlo Alfred Romanelli (1872–1947) was an Italian sculptor, born in Florence, Italy August 24, 1872 and died August 9, 1947. He came to the United States in 1902, settling in Los Angeles, California. He moved to Detroit, Michigan in the early 1920s. He was the son of Italian sculptor Raffaello Romanelli (1856–1928) who created the 1927 bust of Dante Alighieri on Belle Isle Park in Detroit. Among Carlo Romanelli's Detroit works are the bronze tablet of Cadillac's landing, now at the Cadillac Center People Mover Station  downtown, and La Pieta at the entrance of Mt. Elliott Cemetery. Carlo attended the Royal Academy of Art in Italy and studied with his father and sculptor Augusto Rivalta; Rivalta's Detroit statue of Christopher Columbus (1910) is now at Jefferson Avenue and Randolph Street.

Other works by Romanelli completed for Detroit include a bust of Bishop Foley, which was not sited.

References

Further reading

Nawrocki, Dennis and Thomas Holleman, Art in Detroit Public Places, Wayne State University Press, Detroit, Michigan 1980

Italian emigrants to the United States
Artists from Detroit
1872 births
1947 deaths
20th-century American sculptors
20th-century American male artists
American male sculptors
Sculptors from Michigan